Siriu is a commune in Buzău County, Muntenia, Romania, in the valley of the river Buzău. It is composed of five villages: Cașoca, Colțu Pietrii, Gura Siriului, Lunca Jariștei (the commune centre) and Mușcelușa.

Geography

Location
Siriu is located in the north-western part of the county, in the Buzău Mountains, at the Carpathians' curvature, on both sides of the river Buzău. The maximum altitude of the Siriu commune exceeds 1400 m. 

The Siriu Dam, constructed between 1982 and 1994 and its artificial lake are located in the commune. Lacul Vulturilor is a periglacial lake also located in Siriu.

Flora and fauna
In 1972, 10 chamois were brought to Siriu and released in the wilderness of the mountain ranges. As of 2007, their number has risen to around 60. One of the largest firs in Romania, measuring 62 meters in height and 2.5 meters in diameter, grows in a forest in Siriu. A protected plant, Drosera rotundifolia, can also be found in the Siriu forests.

History
The oldest attestation of Siriu dates back to the mid-sixteenth century. A document issued by the voivod of Wallachia granted ownership of some land in Siriu to Petru and Lupu.

Economy
Many of the locals work at the Nehoiaşu hydroelectric power plant. Another branch of industry active in Siriu is wood processing. Other locals grow animals (mostly sheep or bovine), and fruit trees.

Notes

External links
  The Buzău Mountains - SIRIU locality

Siriu
Localities in Muntenia